Mount McLennan is a prominent mountain rising over  at the north side of Taylor Valley, surmounting the area at the heads of Canada Glacier, Commonwealth Glacier and Loftus Glacier, in Victoria Land, Antarctica. It was named by C.S. Wright of the British Antarctic Expedition (1910–13) for Professor McLennan, a physicist at Toronto University, Canada.

Geologist Thomas E. Berg killed in helicopter crash (11/19/69) on the side of Mt. McLennan. NZ cameraman Jeremy Sykes also killed.

References

Mountains of Victoria Land
McMurdo Dry Valleys